Yuanmen may refer to:
Yuanmen Committee, Tancheng, Pingtan County.
Yuanmen language, one of the Hlai languages.
Yuanmen Township (元门乡), Hainan.